Teplice Symphony Orchestra is a professional symphony orchestra based in Teplice, the Czech Republic.

The orchestra perform regularly around the country and has worked with a number of world-renowned artists and conductors.

External links
 

Czech orchestras
Teplice